Micula is a commune of 5,214 inhabitants situated in Satu Mare County, Romania. It is composed of three villages: Bercu Nou (Újberek), Micula and Micula Nouă (Újmikola).

Demographics
Ethnic groups (2002 census): 
Hungarians: 38.48%
Romanians: 38.43%
Roma (Gypsies): 6.47%

According to mother tongue, 39.65% of the population speak Hungarian as their first language, while 39.51% speak Romanian.

References

Communes in Satu Mare County